Helioplex is a formulation of broad-spectrum ultraviolet (UVA and UVB) skin protection containing avobenzone and oxybenzone made by Neutrogena.

Avobenzone-containing products have decreasing efficiency after a few hours of sun exposure, but the manufacturer claims that the addition of oxybenzone reduces the amount of degradation that occurs.

Aveeno advertises its products using this formulation under a different name of "Active Photobarrier Complex."

References

Skin care brands
Johnson & Johnson brands